Robert Michael James Sissons (born 29 September 1988) is former English professional footballer who played as a defensive midfielder.

He made his professional debut in his only appearance for Bolton Wanderers on 7 January 2006. He came on as an 84th-minute substitute for Bruno Ngotty in a 3–0 win away to Watford. 

On 15 June 2009 it was confirmed that Sissons would be leaving Bolton at the end of his contract, alongside Nathan Woolfe, Blerim Džemaili and James Sinclair. From here he accepted a place at the  University of Manchester to read Law where he captained the University's men's football team.

In 2012, he joined Droylsden of the Conference North. He played 29 games for the Bloods in his only season, scoring in a 5–2 win over Vauxhall Motors on 27 August, a 4–2 home loss to Solihull Moors on 8 September, and a 2–2 draw at Hinckley United on 18 April 2013.

Career statistics

References

External links

1988 births
Living people
Footballers from Stockport
English footballers
Association football defenders
Bolton Wanderers F.C. players
Droylsden F.C. players
National League (English football) players
Alumni of the University of Manchester